PGRC can refer to:

 Phased Geological Repository Concept developed by NIREX (now Nuclear Decommissioning Authority, NDA, Radioactive Waste Management, RMW) for the deep geological repository program in the United Kingdom 
 Philadelphia Girls' Rowing Club
 A seedbank, including:
 Plant Genetic Resources Canada, part of Agriculture and Agri-Food Canada
 Plant Genetic Resources Centre:
 in Ethiopia, founded by Melaku Worede
 operated by the Southern African Development Community
 in Sri Lanka
 in Uganda